Pycnoepisinus is a monotypic genus of Kenyan comb-footed spiders containing the single species, Pycnoepisinus kilimandjaroensis. It was first described by J. Wunderlich in 2008, and is found in Kenya.

See also
 List of Theridiidae species

References

Monotypic Araneomorphae genera
Spiders of Africa
Theridiidae